Lucas Taylor Maia Reis (born 10 April 1995), known as Lucas Taylor, is a Brazilian professional footballer who plays as a right-back for Ukrainian Premier League club Shakhtar Donetsk, on loan from Super League Greece club PAOK.

Club career
A member of Palmeiras' youth academy since 2007, Lucas Taylor began playing for the club in the under-12 category. After acting as a forward and a defensive midfielder, Taylor found his ideal position in the right back.

Lucas Taylor made good performances in the Campeonato Paulista and Brasileiro U20, calling the attention of the first team with his speed and skill. His first match as a senior player was away against Coritiba, for the Série A in August 2015. In his first season, Taylor also came as a second-half substitute for João Pedro in the Copa do Brasil Final's 2nd leg at Allianz Parque, eventually winning his first title.

His performances soon began to attract the attention of clubs in Europe. A newcomer to the Ukrainian top flight, Lviv, acquired him on loan from Palmeiras for a year.

Taylor adapted quickly and managed to score three goals and provide two assists in three appearances. He returned to Palmeiras and then moved to Portuguese second tier club Estoril on a free transfer.

For the first six months he did not get any playing time and decided to leave. Dnipro-1, who knew of him from his time in Lviv, opted to acquire him in January 2020. With his new team, Taylor played 30 times, scoring once and contributing three assists.

On 29 June 2021, Lucas Taylor signed a three-year contract with Super League Greece side PAOK, with the choice of one year extension once the contract is over, being the first transfer of the club for the upcoming season.

Career statistics

Honours
Palmeiras
Copa do Brasil: 2015

PAOK
Greek Cup runner-up: 2021–22

References

External links
Palmeiras official profile  

1995 births
Living people
People from Guarulhos
Brazilian footballers
Association football defenders
Campeonato Brasileiro Série A players
Campeonato Brasileiro Série B players
Ukrainian Premier League players
Super League Greece players
Sociedade Esportiva Palmeiras players
Criciúma Esporte Clube players
Paraná Clube players
Red Bull Brasil players
Paysandu Sport Club players
Botafogo Futebol Clube (SP) players
Boa Esporte Clube players
FC Lviv players
G.D. Estoril Praia players
SC Dnipro-1 players
PAOK FC players
FC Shakhtar Donetsk players
Brazilian expatriate footballers
Expatriate footballers in Ukraine
Expatriate footballers in Portugal
Expatriate footballers in Greece
Brazilian expatriate sportspeople in Ukraine
Brazilian expatriate sportspeople in Portugal
Brazilian expatriate sportspeople in Greece
Footballers from São Paulo (state)